Albufera (Catalan for "lagoon") may refer to any of several coastal lagoons in Spain:
 Albufera de Valencia, on the Gulf of Valencia
 S'Albufera de Mallorca, on the island of Mallorca
 S'Albufereta, also on Mallorca
 S'Albufera des Grau, on Menorca
 Albufera of Gayanes, in Gayanes (Province of Alicante)